Play Dirty is the fourth studio album by British heavy metal band, Girlschool, released on Bronze Records in 1983 and produced by Noddy Holder and Jim Lea from the hard rock band Slade.
It was the first Girlschool album not to enter the UK Top 40 album chart and signalled a general downturn in their career, along with an inclination towards a softer rock sound. Kelly Johnson left the band soon after the release and an intended full US-tour never materialised.
In the UK, two singles were lifted from the album, each having a picture-sleeve:
"20th Century Boy"/ "Breaking All the Rules" on 7-inch, the 12-inch adding "Like It Like That". "20th Century Boy" is a T. Rex cover.
"Burning in the Heat"/ "Surrender" as both the 7-inch and 12-inch single release. (1984)

In 2005, Castle subsidiary Sanctuary Records re-issued the album on CD with songs from the EP 1-2-3-4 Rock and Roll and other compilations as bonus tracks, and extensive sleevenotes by Record Collector magazine's Joe Geesin.

Drummer Denise Dufort rated the album as her favourite of all the band's career: "Play Dirty as it has a more mature sound to it and I think it sounds a bit like Def Leppard, also Jim Lea and Noddy Holder from Slade produced it".

Reception

From contemporary reviews, Josephine Hocking wrote in Smash Hits called the album a "cliche-ridden Heavy Metal album" and noted that song like "Burning in the Heat" and "Play Dirty" proved "beyond any reasonable doubt that sexist lyrics and boring guitar solos can be done equally badly by women as by men."

Track listing

Personnel
Band members
 Kim McAuliffe – rhythm guitar, lead vocals on tracks 3, 5, 7, 8, 9, 10, 11, 12, 13, 14
 Kelly Johnson – lead guitar, lead vocals on tracks 1, 2, 4, 6
 Gil Weston – bass, backing vocals
 Denise Dufort – drums

Additional musicians
Lemmy - backing vocals
Vicki Blue - backing vocals
Don Garbutt - keyboards and explosions
Mark Haircut - tambourine, backing vocals
Paul Samson - handclaps and general noise

Production
 Produced by Noddy Holder and Jim Lea
 Mixed by Jim Lea

Charts

References

External links
 Official Girlschool discography

Girlschool albums
1983 albums
Bronze Records albums
Mercury Records albums